George Davison may refer to:
George Davison (photographer) (1854–1930), English photographer
George Davison (merchant) (?–1799), Quebecois businessman and political figure 
George Davison (footballer) (born 1890), English footballer
George M. Davison (1855–1912), American politician from Kentucky
George Davison (priest) (born 1965) Irish priest, Bishop of Connor

See also
George Davidson (disambiguation)